The 2008 World Snooker Championship (also referred to as the 2008 888.com World Snooker Championship for the purposes of sponsorship) was a professional snooker tournament that took place between 19 April and 5 May 2008 at the Crucible Theatre in Sheffield, England. It was the 33rd consecutive year that the World Snooker Championship was held at the Crucible Theatre, and the seventh and final ranking event of the 2007–08 snooker season. The tournament was organised by World Snooker, and sponsored by betting company 888.com. The tournament featured a total prize fund of £1,050,000 with £250,000 being awarded to the winner.

Qualifying for the event took place between 6 and 11 January at Pontin's in Prestatyn, Wales. Sixteen players progressed from a four-round qualification tournament to meet a further sixteen seeded players. John Higgins was the defending champion who had won his second championship the previous year, defeating Mark Selby in the final 18–13. This year, Higgins lost in the second round 9–13 to Ryan Day. Ronnie O'Sullivan met Ali Carter in the final, won 18–8 to win his 20th ranking title.

Overview
The World Snooker Championship is an annual cue sport tournament and the official world championship of the game of snooker. Founded in the late 19th century by British Army soldiers stationed in India, the sport was popular in Great Britain. In modern times it has been played worldwide, especially in East and Southeast Asian nations such as China, Hong Kong and Thailand. The event  was sponsored by 888.com.

In the 2008 tournament, 32 professional players competed in one-on-one snooker matches played over several , using a single-elimination tournament format. The 32 players were selected for the event using the  snooker world rankings and a pre-tournament qualification competition. In 1927, the first world championship was won by Joe Davis. The event's final took place in Camkin's Hall, Birmingham, England. Since 1977, the event has been held at the Crucible Theatre in Sheffield, England. The event was organised by the World Professional Billiards and Snooker Association. Scotsman John Higgins was the defending champion, having defeated Mark Selby 18–13 in the previous years final.

Format
The 2008 World Snooker Championship took place from 19 April to 5 May 2008 in Sheffield, England. The tournament was the last of seven ranking events in the 2007–08 snooker season on the World Snooker Tour. It featured a 32-player main draw that was held at the Crucible Theatre, as well as a qualifying draw that was played at the Pontin's, Prestatyn Sands, from 6 to 11 January. This was the 32nd consecutive year that the tournament had been staged at the Crucible.

The top 16 players in the latest world rankings automatically qualified for the main draw as seeded players. Higgins was seeded first overall as the defending champion, and the remaining 15 seeds were allocated based on the latest world rankings. The number of frames required to win a match increased throughout the tournament. The first round consisted of best-of-19-frames matches, with the final match being played over a maximum of 35 frames. All 16 non-seeded spots in the main draw were filled with players from the qualifying rounds. The event was broadcast by the BBC and Eurosport in Europe.

Prize fund
The breakdown of prize money for this year is shown below:

Winner: £250,000
Runner-up: £125,000
Semi-final: £52,000
Quarter-final: £22,000
Last 16: £14,000
Last 32: £10,600
Last 48: £7400
Last 64: £4500

Stage one highest break: £1000
Stage two highest break: £10,000
Stage one maximum break: £5000
Stage two maximum break: £147,000
Total: £1,050,000

Tournament summary

Early rounds
The first round was played between 20 and 24 April as the best of 19 frames, held over two . Defending champion John Higgins defeated Matthew Stevens 10–5, but runner-up Mark Selby was knocked out by qualifier Mark King 10–8. Ding Junhui's 10–9 victory over Marco Fu was his first ever win at the Crucible. Stephen Maguire took the first eight frames in the first session of his first round match against Anthony Hamilton, before Hamilton won frame 9. Maguire won the match 10–3. Three players were making their debuts at the event; Jamie Cope, Liu Chuang  and Liang Wenbo. Of the three, Wenbo won their first round match, as he defeated Ken Doherty 10–5. The defeat caused Doherty to drop out of the top 16 of the World Rankings for the first time since the 1992/93 season.

The second round was played from 24 to 28 April as the best of 25 frames, held over three sessions. Defending champion Higgins was defeated by Ryan Day 9–13. This was the first time Day had progressed to the quarter-finals at the event. Ronnie O'Sullivan made a maximum break against Mark Williams in the final frame of his 13–7 win. Williams, ranked twelfth in the world before the tournament, fell out of the top 16 after the loss. Hendry reached the quarter-finals for the seventeenth time in his career, after a 13–7 win over Ding Junhui. Maguire also won the first eight frames of the match in his second round clash with Neil Robertson, which he won 13–7. Leading at 12–10, Liang Wenbo punched the air in celebration as he potted . However, his opponent, Joe Swail earned the  he required, and also won the next frame to force the match into a deciding frame. Swail missed a  allowing Wenbo to win the match 13–12. After the match, Swail complained bitterly that in the final frame the referee had incorrectly replaced the cue ball after calling a miss, giving Liang an easier escape from a snooker, and accused Liang of unprofessional conduct for not pointing out the referee's mistake.

Later rounds (Quarter-finals—final)

The quarter-finals were played on 29 and 30 April as the best of 25 frames held over three sessions. Carter made a maximum break in his 13–9 win over Ebdon. His opponent came very close to a maximum of his own just a frame earlier, but narrowly missed the fifteenth black. Just minutes before on the other table, Stephen Hendry was also attempting a maximum of his own but also missed the fifteenth red. Hendry reached the 12th Crucible semi-final of his career after a 13–7 win over Day, setting a record for one-table appearances that still stands. Wenbo was the first player from mainland China to reach the quarter-finals of the world championships, but lost 7–13 to O'Sullivan. Perry defeated Maguire on a deciding frame 13–12.

The semi-finals were played from the 1 to 3 May as the best of 33 frames. After tying the first session 4–4, O'Sullivan completed an 8–0 whitewash over Hendry in their second session, and won the first frame of session three, meaning that O'Sullivan had won twelve consecutive frames from 1–4 down to 13–4 in front. At one point O'Sullivan scored 448 points without reply. This was the first time Hendry had lost every frame in a full session at the Crucible. Carter reached his first ranking final by defeating Perry 17–15.

The final was played on 4 and 5 May between O'Sullivan and Carter. Both men were English for the first time since the 1991 event, when John Parrott defeated Jimmy White 18–11. O'Sullivan led 11–5 after the first day's play and won the match 18–8. This was O'Sullivan's third world championship joining Steve Davis and Hendry having won than two World titles at the Crucible; and was his 20th career ranking title. In post-match interviews, both players admitted to not having played particularly well, with O'Sullivan commenting "Ali and I are disappointed not to put on a better performance". Carter's performance was described as "jaded". The win also gave O'Sullivan the top spot in the world rankings.

Main draw 
Shown below are the results for each round. The numbers in parentheses beside some of the players are their seeding ranks.

Qualification

Preliminary qualifying
The preliminary qualifying rounds for the tournament took place at Pontin's in Prestatyn, Wales  between 3 and 5 January 2008.

Round 1

Round 2

Round 3

Qualifying
The qualifying rounds 1–4 for the tournament took place at Pontin's in Prestatyn, Wales  between 6 and 11 January 2008. The final round of qualifying took place at the English Institute of Sport in Sheffield between 7 and 10 March.

Round 1

Rounds 2–5

Century breaks

Televised stage centuries
The highest break received a prize of £10,000, and a maximum break received a prize of £147,000 – a total of £157,000. This prize was shared, as two players made a 147, winning £78,500 each. In total there were 63 century breaks made at this year's world championships. O'Sullivan and Carter both made a maximum break during the event.

147, 140, 138, 135, 133, 126, 123, 109, 106, 102, 102, 100  Ronnie O'Sullivan
147, 128, 128, 106, 104, 100  Ali Carter
143, 113, 109, 103  Peter Ebdon
140, 124, 112, 112, 110  Stephen Hendry
137  Stuart Bingham
133, 105  Joe Swail
132, 127, 121, 110, 104, 102  Joe Perry
131, 118, 112, 110, 100  Stephen Maguire
126, 101  Jamie Cope
126  Graeme Dott
125  Nigel Bond
123, 104  Liang Wenbo
121, 116, 112  Mark King
120, 103  John Higgins
114, 113  Ding Junhui
112  Matthew Stevens
108  Mark Selby
104  Ryan Day
104  Michael Judge
103, 100  Marco Fu
102  Mark Allen
102  Anthony Hamilton
102  Shaun Murphy

Qualifying stage centuries
The highest break in qualifying was a 139 made by Patrick Wallace.

 139, 113, 103  Patrick Wallace
 138  Leo Fernandez
 138  Gerard Greene
 137  Mark Davis
 136, 112, 105, 101  Liang Wenbo
 135  Rod Lawler
 132, 110  Dominic Dale
 132, 103  Andy Hicks
 129, 100  Alex Davies
 127  Xiao Guodong
 126  Robert Milkins
 123, 107  Matthew Stevens
 122  Rory McLeod
 119  Adrian Gunnell
 118  Michael White
 116  Marco Fu
 112  Jamie Burnett
 112  Fergal O'Brien
 110  Tom Ford
 109  Michael Judge
 109  Ian McCulloch
 109  Steve Mifsud
 109  Munraj Pal
 108  Liu Chuang
 106  David Roe
 105  Marcus Campbell
 104  Mark Allen
 104  Tian Pengfei
 103  Jamie O'Neill
 102, 101, 100  Ian Preece
 101  James McBain
 101  Joe Perry
 101  Jimmy White
 100  Anthony Hamilton

Notes

References

External links
 Video of O'Sullivan's 147

2008
World Championship
World Snooker Championship
Sports competitions in Sheffield
World Snooker Championship
World Snooker Championship